Eugene Leslie Roberts Jr. (born June 15, 1932) is an American journalist and professor of journalism. He has been a national editor of The New York Times, executive editor of The Philadelphia Inquirer from 1972 to 1990, and managing editor of The New York Times from 1994 to 1997. Roberts is most known for presiding over The Inquirer "Golden Age", a time in which the newspaper was given increased freedom and resources, won 17 Pulitzer Prizes in 18 years, displaced The Philadelphia Bulletin as the city's "paper of record", and was considered to be Knight Ridder's crown jewel as a profitable enterprise and an influential regional paper.

Career
Roberts was born in Pikeville in the Goldsboro, North Carolina Metropolitan Area. He grew up in North Carolina and worked for newspapers in Goldsboro, N.C.; Norfolk, Va.; Raleigh, N.C.; and Detroit.  He covered the Kennedy Assassination in Dallas for the Detroit Free Press and subsequently covered the Civil Rights Movement as a correspondent for The New York Times, where he also served as Saigon bureau chief in 1968 during the Vietnam War. After serving as national editor at The Times from 1969 to 1972, he was hired by John S. Knight to head The Inquirer. He retired in 1990 and returned to the Times as managing editor from 1994 to 1998.

Roberts taught journalism from 1991 to 1994 and from 1998 to 2010 at the Philip Merrill College of Journalism, University of Maryland.

He is on the board of directors of the Committee to Protect Journalists and served five years as its chairman; he has also served as chairman of the Pulitzer Prize Board, the International Press Institute, and the Board Of Visitors of the School of Communications at the University of North Carolina at Chapel Hill.

Pulitzer Prizes
The Inquirer had never won any Pulitzer Prize (established 1917) before Roberts became executive editor but won them under his leadership.

 1975, national reporting
 1976, editorial cartoons
 1977, local reporting
 1978, public service journalism
 1979, international reporting
 1980, local reporting
 1985, investigative reporting
 1985, feature photography
 1986, feature photography
 1986, national reporting
 1987, feature writing
 1987, investigative reporting
 1987, investigative reporting
 1988, national reporting
 1989, national reporting
 1989, feature writing
 1990, public service journalism

Awards
Roberts and Hank Klibanoff, managing editor of the Atlanta Journal-Constitution, won the 2007 Pulitzer Prize for History recognizing their book The Race Beat as the year's best published in the U.S.  In it, Roberts and Klibanoff chronicled the civil rights struggle in America and the role the press played in bringing it to the forefront. The book's major contributions were an analysis of Gunnar Myrdal and Ralph Bunche's  1944 treatise, An American Dilemma: The Negro Problem and Modern Democracy, which had explained the problem of racial inequality and its possible resolution, and a close examination of the contribution of the black press to the Civil Rights Movement.

In 1980, he received the Golden Plate Award of the American Academy of Achievement.

In 1984, Roberts was inducted into the N.C. Journalism Hall of Fame.

Roberts received the National Press Club's Fourth Estate Award for Distinguished Contributions to Journalism in 1993.

Roberts was awarded the Order of the Long Leaf Pine by the state of North Carolina on January 30, 2015.

Personal
Roberts earned an Associate degree from Mars Hill College in North Carolina. He went on to receive his B.A. in Journalism from the University of North Carolina at Chapel Hill in 1954 and was later a Nieman Fellow at Harvard University.

Books as co-author or co-editor

 The Censors and the Schools (Little, Brown, 1963; Greenwood Press, 1977), by Roberts and Jack Nelson
 Assignment America: A Collection of Outstanding Writing from the New York Times (Quadrangle, 1974), eds. Roberts and David Jones
 Leaving Readers Behind: the age of corporate newspapering (University of Arkansas Press, 2001), editor-in-chief, with Thomas Kunkel and Charles Layton
 Breach of Faith: a crisis of coverage in the age of corporate newspapering (University of Arkansas Press, 2002), editor-in-chief, with Thomas Kunkel
 The Race Beat: The Press, the Civil Rights Struggle, and the Awakening of a Nation (Alfred A. Knopf, 2006), by Roberts and Hank Klibanoff

References

External links
 
 

1932 births
Living people
Pulitzer Prize for History winners
Pulitzer Prize winners for journalism 
American war correspondents
The Philadelphia Inquirer people
The New York Times editors
Detroit Free Press people
University of Maryland, College Park faculty
Nieman Fellows
UNC Hussman School of Journalism and Media alumni
Mars Hill University alumni
George Polk Award recipients
American male journalists
20th-century American newspaper editors
20th-century American historians
American male non-fiction writers
21st-century American historians
21st-century American male writers
20th-century American male writers
People from Wayne County, North Carolina
Journalists from North Carolina